Svend Hansen (17 September 1922 – 7 May 2006) was a Danish footballer. He played in two matches for the Denmark national football team from 1942 to 1949.

References

External links
 

1922 births
2006 deaths
Danish men's footballers
Denmark international footballers
Place of birth missing
Association footballers not categorized by position